"The Freshmen Up at Yale Get No Tail" is a humorous song historically sung by Yale University's Ivy League rivals. The song questions the sexual prowess of Yale students and suggests that they frequently self-gratify with masturbation. Like many songs of its genre, this piece features frequently variable lyrics.

Variations substitute 'fellas' for 'freshmen' and 'down at Yale' for 'up at Yale' when sung by rivals located to the north of Yale's New Haven, Connecticut, location, such as Yale's perennial main rival Harvard University. Although the song's origins are not entirely clear, the Columbia University Marching Band is sometimes given credit for composing it.

Lyrics

External links
Article discussing this song being sung by the Columbia University band, among other things.
Site containing the lyrics
Site discussing, among other things, the song's role in the Princeton University band's halftime show

American college songs
Year of song unknown
Songwriter unknown